East Sidney Lake is a small reservoir located east of Unadilla in Delaware County, New York. The Ouleout Creek flows through East Sidney Lake.

See also
 List of lakes in New York

References 

Lakes of New York (state)
Lakes of Delaware County, New York
Reservoirs in Delaware County, New York